(Stylized as NOWPRO) is a Japanese video game developer headquartered in Chūō-ku, Osaka. Founded in 1986, it started developing various games for major Japanese companies including Namco, Hudson Soft, Capcom, Activision, Taito, Konami, Sega, and Nintendo. The company used to have a development department in East Ikebukuro, Toshima-ku, but it is now closed. Now Production has also been developing and selling software applications for iPhone and iPod Touch since 2009.

List of games

Nintendo Entertainment System
Metro-Cross (1986)
Taito Grand Prix: Eikou heno License (1987)
Spelunker II: Yūsha e no Chōsen (1987)
Jikuu Yuuden: Debias (1987)
Yokai Dochuki (1988)
Wagan Land (1989)
Splatterhouse: Wanpaku Graffiti (1989)
Jackie Chan's Action Kung Fu (1990)
Yo! Noid (1990) (originally in Japan as Kamen no Ninja Hanamaru)
Wagan Land 2 (1990)
Adventure Island II (1991)
Adventure Island III (1992) 
Ms. Pac-Man (1993)
Master Takahashi's Adventure Island IV (1994)

Game Boy
Mickey's Dangerous Chase (1991)
Dig Dug (1992)
Barcode Boy: Kattobi Road (1993)
Adventure Island II: Aliens in Paradise (1993)

Game Boy Advance
Klonoa: Empire of Dreams (2001)
Klonoa 2: Dream Champ Tournament (2002)
WTA Tour Tennis (2002)
Gachinko Pro Yakyuu (2002)
Goemon: New Age Shutsudō! (2002)
Silent Scope (2002)
Metal Max 2 Kai (2003)
One Piece: Going Baseball (2004)

Game Boy Color
Dance Dance Revolution GB (2000)
Dance Dance Revolution GB2 (2000)
Detanabi Pro Yakyuu (2000)
Detanabi Pro Yakyuu 2 (2001)
Dance Dance Revolution GB3 (2001)
Dance Dance Revolution GB Disney Mix (2001)
Oha Star Dance Dance Revolution GB (2001)

Game Gear
Wagan Land (1991)
Pac-Attack (1994)

GameCube
Sonic Adventure DX: Director's Cut (2003)
Mario Superstar Baseball (2005)
Sonic Riders (2006)

Sega Genesis
Quad Challenge (1991)
Splatterhouse 2 (1992)
Splatterhouse 3 (1993)
Rolling Thunder 3 (1993)

Neo Geo
Neo Bomberman (1997)

Nintendo DS
Nazotte Oboeru Otona no Kanji Renshuu Kanzenban (2007)
Shoho Kara wa Hajimeru Otona no Eitango Renshuu (2008)
Unsolved Crimes (2008)
Zero Kara Hajimeru: Otona no 5-Kokugo Nyuumon (2008)
Bakugan Battle Brawlers (2009)
Kodawari Saihai Simulation: Ocha no Ma Pro Yakyuu DS (2009)
Imi Gawakaru Otona no Jukugo Renshuu: Kadokawa Ruigo Shinjiten Kara 5-Man Mon (2009)
WireWay (2009)
Nazotte Oboeru Otona no Kanji Renshuu Kaiteiban (2010)
Zoobles! Spring to Life! (2011)

Nintendo Switch
Deadly Premonition 2: A Blessing in Disguise (2020)
Pac-Man Museum + (2022)
Pac-Man World Re-Pac (2022)

PC Engine/TurboGrafx-16
Chew Man Fu (1990)
Bravoman (1990)
Dragon Saber (1991)
Final Soldier (1991)
Jackie Chan's Action Kung Fu (1991)
Doraemon: Nobita no Dorabian Night (1991 and 1992)
Samurai Ghost (1992)
New Adventure Island (1992)
Power Tennis (1993)

PlayStation
Namco Museum Vol. 1 (1995)
Namco Museum Vol. 3 (1996)
Digical League (1997)
Smash Court 2 (1998)
Block Kuzushi (1999)
Extreme Go-Kart Racing (2000)
Rescue Shot (2000)
Ganbare Goemon: Oedo Daikaiten (2001)
Goemon: Shin Sedai Shūmei! (2001)
Big League Slugger Baseball (2003)

PlayStation 2
Ninja Assault (2002)
Surfing Air Show with Rat Boy (2002)
Gachinko Pro Yakyuu (2003)
Katamari Damacy (2004)
Demon Chaos (2005)
We Love Katamari (2005)
Twinkle Star Sprites: La Petite Princesse (2005)
Sonic Riders (2006)
Bakugan Battle Brawlers (2009)

PlayStation 3
Bakugan Battle Brawlers (2009)

PlayStation Portable
Higanjima (2005)
PQ: Practical Intelligence Quotient (2005)
PQ2: Practical Intelligence Quotient 2 (2006)
Undead Knights (2009)

Super Nintendo Entertainment System
Super Power League (1993)
King of the Monsters 2 (1993)
Miracle Girls (1993)
Super Kyuukyoku Harikiri Stadium 2 (1994)
Super Power League 2 (1994)
Super Power League 3 (1995)
Supapoon (1995)
Supapoon DX (1996)
Super Power League 4 (1996)

Wii
Mario Super Sluggers (2008)
Little League World Series Baseball 2008 (2008)
Little League World Series Baseball 2009 (2009)
Bakugan Battle Brawlers (2009)
Transformers: Prime – The Game (2012)

Xbox
Sonic Riders (2006)

Xbox 360
Beautiful Katamari (2007)
Bakugan Battle Brawlers (2009)

Notes

References

External links

Amusement companies of Japan
Video game companies established in 1986
Video game companies of Japan
Video game development companies
Video game publishers
Japanese companies established in 1986